Located in Bern, Switzerland, the Camerata Bern was founded in 1963 as a conductorless, flexible chamber orchestra. The Camerata Bern performs early Baroque to contemporary classical music. The group tours extensively worldwide and is releasing CD recordings regularly. 

The artistic director as of the season 2018–19 is Patricia Kopatchinskaja and the fifteen members are:

Violin
 Hyunjong Kang
 Claudia Ajmone-Marsan
 Meesun Hong Coleman
 Sibylla Leuenberger
 Michael Bollin
 Christina Merblum
 Suyeon Kang
 Sonja Starke

Viola
 Anna Puig-Torné
 Alejandro Mettler
 Friedemann Jähnig

Cello
 Thomas Kaufmann
 Martin Merker

Double bass
 Käthi Steuri

Harpsichord
 Vital Julian Frey

External links
Camerata Bern Official Website

Chamber orchestras
Early music orchestras
ECM Records artists
Swiss orchestras
Musical groups established in 1963
1963 establishments in Switzerland